Yurii Vlasov (born 1964) is a John Bardeen Endowed Chair in Electrical and Computer Engineering and Physics at the University of Illinois Urbana–Champaign (UIUC).

Prior to joining UIUC in 2016, Vlasov held various research and managerial positions at the IBM T. J. Watson Research Center. In 2001-2015 he led broad company-wide efforts in integrated silicon nanophotonics and more recently in neuromorphic computing architectures.

Vlasov is recognized both as a scholar with scientific discoveries in the area of extreme optical confinement at the nanoscale – nanophotonics, as well as an industrial engineer who has led the successful transition of this basic scientific knowledge (TRL level 1–2) into a real-world manufacturable (TRL level 8–9) silicon nanophotonics technology.

The CMOS9WG
technology developed under the leadership of Vlasov at IBM and lately deployed at GlobalFoundries is enabling high-performance optical connectivity in supercomputers, data centers, metro, and long-haul communications, while significantly reducing cost and maximizing energy efficiency.

Vlasov has been elected to the National Academy of Engineering in 2021, for "contributions to development and commercialization of silicon photonics for optical data communications". He has also been elected a Fellow of Optical Society of America in 2007, a Fellow of American Physical Society in 2007, and a Fellow of Institute of Electrical and Electronics Engineers in 2015 for his contributions to nanophotonics including photonic crystals and silicon photonics.

References

External links
Yurii Vlasov's Research Group Website at UIUC
Faculty Web Page at Department of Electrical and Computer Engineering at UIUC
Publications and patents at Google Scholar

Members of the United States National Academy of Engineering
Fellows of Optica (society)
Fellow Members of the IEEE
Fellows of the American Physical Society
Living people
1964 births